
Kuršių Nerija National Park is one of the five national parks in Lithuania. It was established in 1991 to protect the unique ecosystems of the Curonian Spit and Curonian Lagoon.

Kuršių Nerija National Park is protected by the state, under the Lithuanian law of Protected Areas. Since 1997 it is a member of EUROPARC Federation. The Park has Category II in the classification of the IUCN.

Nagliai nature reserve 

Nagliai nature reserve protects the Dead dunes. Dead (Mirusios), or Gray (Pilkosios) dunes are large sand hills built by strong winds, with ravines and erosions. Nagliai nature reserve is a place for habitats of rare plants, included in the Red Book, four villages and two old cemetery sites that are hiding under the sand. Any human activity is prohibited in the reserve except for scientific observations. The cognitive trail of Nagliai is the only place from which you can explore the reserve's objects. 

In 1675–1854 four Nagliai villages here were covered in sand.

See also
 List of national parks in the Baltics
 Curonian Spit National Park (Russia)
Parnidis Dune

References

External links
Official Web page of the Park 
The Trail of Nagliai Nature Reserve

National parks of Lithuania
Protected areas established in 1991
1991 establishments in Lithuania
Tourist attractions in Klaipėda County